Budziska  is a village in the administrative district of Gmina Kuźnia Raciborska, within Racibórz County, Silesian Voivodeship, in southern Poland.

The village has a population of 670.

Gallery

References

Budziska